Alan Charles Compton Robilliard (20 December 1903 – 23 April 1990) was a New Zealand rugby union player. A wing three-quarter, Robilliard represented  at a provincial level, and was a member of the New Zealand national side, the All Blacks, from 1924 to 1928. In his 27 matches for the All Blacks, three of which were internationals, he scored 25 tries.

References

1903 births
1990 deaths
Rugby union players from Ashburton, New Zealand
People educated at Ashburton College
New Zealand rugby union players
New Zealand international rugby union players
Canterbury rugby union players
Rugby union wings